Konrad Knute Solberg (June 25, 1874 – January 28, 1954) was a Minnesota legislator and the 27th Lieutenant Governor of Minnesota.

Background
Solberg was born in Rushford, Minnesota. He was the son of Knute Solberg and Aasild (Haugen) Solberg, both Norwegian immigrants born in Treungen in Telemark. His family  moved to Yellow Medicine County, Minnesota when he was five years old. Solberg was a farmer and merchant. He became Vice President of the  Farmers and Merchants State Bank. He was later made a Director of the Clarkfield Telephone Company.  He was a member of the Clarkfield Norwegian Lutheran church.

Career
Solbergwas a member of the Farmer-Labor Party. Solberg entered political office serving first was the Town Supervisor of Clarkfield, Minnesota. He later became a member of the School Board and served as School District Clerk of public schools in Clarkfield, Minnesota. He served as a Minnesota legislator in the Minnesota State Senate during the 43rd – 46th Legislative Sessions (1/2/1923 -1/5/1931). Solberg became Lieutenant Governor under Governor Floyd B. Olson from January 3, 1933 – January 8, 1935.

Personal life
In 1897, he was united in marriage to Sophie Swenson Aas (1874-1953). They were the parents of nine children. He died in 1954 in Clarkfield, Minnesota and was buried in the Clarkfield Lutheran Cemetery.

References

External links
Konrad K. Solberg, Photograph

1874 births
1954 deaths
People from Rushford, Minnesota
American Lutherans
American people of Norwegian descent
Lieutenant Governors of Minnesota
Minnesota state senators
Minnesota Farmer–Laborites
School board members in Minnesota